The 1997 is the second edition of the Copa Bolivia. The Copa Bolivia would start in January and end in October.

Qualifying rounds

First qualifying round

|}

Second qualifying round

|}

Third qualifying round
 5 best Loser from the second round also qualified.

|}

Group stage

One City would be hosting this group and its Santa Cruz de La Sierra.

Group A

Group B

Pando would be hosting this group.

Semi-final

|}

Final

|}

Bol
Bol